Hugo González de Oliveira (born 19 February 1999) is a Spanish swimmer. He is the son of a Spanish father and a Brazilian mother. He competed in the men's 100 metre backstroke and the men's 200 backstroke events at the 2016 Olympics, and in the men's 100 metre backstroke event at the 2020 Summer Olympics.

He also competed at the 2016 European Junior Championships in Hodmezovasarhely winning 2 gold medals in 200 back 1:57.00 and 400IM 4:17.27

Hugo competed at the 2017 World Championships in Budapest for Spain. He took 23rd in the 100 back in 55.05, 26th in the 200 IM in 2:02.78 and 32nd in the 200 back in 2:02.41. He won 3 gold medals and a silver medal at the 2017 World Junior Championships. Gold in 400IM with a championship record 4:14.65, 200 back 1:56.69 with also a championship record and 100 back 54.27, and silver in 50 back 25.30.

References

External links
 

1999 births
Living people
Sportspeople from Palma de Mallorca
Spanish male medley swimmers
Olympic swimmers of Spain
Swimmers at the 2016 Summer Olympics
Swimmers at the 2020 Summer Olympics
Mediterranean Games silver medalists for Spain
Mediterranean Games bronze medalists for Spain
Mediterranean Games medalists in swimming
Swimmers at the 2018 Mediterranean Games
Spanish male backstroke swimmers
Spanish male freestyle swimmers
European Aquatics Championships medalists in swimming
Auburn Tigers men's swimmers
California Golden Bears men's swimmers
Spanish people of Brazilian descent